All About Love is an album by American pop singer Johnny Mathis that was released on May 7, 1996, by Columbia Records and pairs him with producer Phil Ramone for his first venture into contemporary material since 1985's Right from the Heart. The two albums share the fact that they do not include covers of songs associated with other artists, which makes them unique entries in the Mathis catalog.

The album reached number 119 during its one week on the Billboard 200 album chart in the issue of the magazine dated May 25 of that year.

Reception
Mathis's new offering earned the approval of Billboard magazine: "From the layered string sounds of 'I Will Walk Away' to the intimacy of 'Why Goodbye' to the catchy chorus of 'Every Beat of My Heart,' Mathis soothes with his trademark silky tenor."

Track listing

 "Let Your Heart Remember" (Stephen Bishop, Jeff Jones) – 4:36
 "I Will Walk Away" (Gerry Goffin, Carole King) – 3:59
 "Every Beat of My Heart" (Earl Rose, Brian McKnight) – 3:58
 "Why Goodbye" (Diane Warren) – 4:50
 "Like No One in the World" (Burt Bacharach, John Bettis) – 4:31
 "One More Night" (Stephen Bishop) – 3:26
 "Let Me Be the One" (Burt Bacharach, Denise Rich, Taja Sevelle) – 5:00
 "Welcome Home" (Ray Chafin, Dobie Gray, Bud Reneau) – 3:20
 "Sometimes Love's Not Enough" (Kenny Denton, Danny Saxon) – 4:37
 "Could It Be Love This Time" (Mark Radice) – 3:18

Personnel
From the liner notes for the original album:

Performers
Johnny Mathis – vocals
Mark Portmann – arrangements; keyboards
Michael Thompson – guitar ("Let Me Be the One", "Let Your Heart Remember", "Why Goodbye")
Dean Parks – guitar ("Welcome Home", "Like No One in the World", "One More Night", "I Will Walk Away")
Warren Wiebe – background vocals ("Let Me Be the One", "Let Your Heart Remember", "Like No One in the World", "Every Beat of My Heart", "I Will Walk Away", "Why Goodbye", "Welcome Home")
Alexandra Brown – background vocals ("Let Me Be the One", "Let Your Heart Remember", "Like No One in the World", "Every Beat of My Heart")
Carmen Twillie – background vocals ("Let Me Be the One", "Let Your Heart Remember", "Like No One in the World", "Every Beat of My Heart")
Monalisa Young – background vocals ("Let Me Be the One", "Let Your Heart Remember", "Like No One in the World", "Every Beat of My Heart")
Danny Saxon – background vocals ("Sometimes Love's Not Enough")

Production
Phil Ramone – producer, mixer
Bill Malina – engineer
Kaz Masumoto – mixer
Mike Baumgartner – associate mixing engineer
Don Devito – A&R
Krish Sharma – assistant engineer
John Srebalus – assistant engineer
Susanne Marie Edgren – production coordinator
Chie Masumoto – production coordinator
Nancy Donald – art direction
Hooshik – design
Rocky Schenck – photography
Mixed at  A&M Recording Studios

References

Bibliography

1996 albums
Johnny Mathis albums
Albums produced by Phil Ramone
Columbia Records albums
Albums recorded at A&M Studios